Al-Rafidain Sport Club is an Iraqi football team based in Al Diwaniyah, that plays in Iraq Division Two.

History

in Premier League
Al-Rafidain team played in the Iraqi Premier League for the first time in the 1974–75 season, when the first edition of the Clubs League was launched in Iraq, and the team was not good enough, and finished the season at the bottom of the standings, and eventually relegated to the Iraq Division One.

Famous players
Faleh Abed Hajim (1966–1968)

See also
 2000–01 Iraqi Elite League
 2021–22 Iraq FA Cup

References

External links
 Al-Rafidain SC on Goalzz.com
 Iraq Clubs- Foundation Dates

1965 establishments in Iraq
Association football clubs established in 1965
Football clubs in Al-Qādisiyyah